Diego Andrés Molano Aponte (born 29 June 1970) is a Colombian politician and business administrator who served as the Minister of National Defense since 1 February 2021 under president Ivan Duque.

Biography

Early life, education and career 
Diego Andrés Molano Aponte was born in Bogotá on 29 June 1970. He studied business administration at the Del Rosario University, specialized in international integration and then he earned his master's degree at Columbia University. New York.

He was the professor and a researcher at the Del Rosario University, where he published a book called Inter-Agency Coordination as a Generator of Public Value and Social Transformation.

Political career 

On 1 February 2021 Molano was named minister of national defense of Colombia.

Achievements

Security 

In 2021, the number of murders victims was reduced by 11% compared to 2020, dropping from 162 to 144 victims. At the same time, in 2021, there was a 9% decrease in the number of cases of homicide, going from 33 to 30 cases. This reflects a change in the growing trend of cases and victims of homicide that took place over the last 5 years.

Fight against armed crime 

Between February 2021 and March 2022, important blows have been delivered to Organized Armed Groups, which has decimated their command-and-control capabilities within the different criminal organizations:

-Clan del Golfo: The most important blow against this organization was achieved in October 2021 with the capture of alias “Otoniel”, head leader of the Clan del Golfo and responsible for criminal support and expansion, with control over international cocaine trafficking to Central America and Europe.

- OAGs: Killed in combat operations, alias “Arturo or Gerónimo”, coordinator of attacks, threats, extortion and all kinds of crimes in the Department of Arauca.

- Los Pelusos: alias “Pepe” or “Pedro”, alias “Milton” and alias “Cúcuta” (last leader of Los Pelusos) were all captured.

- Los Caparros: Alias “Flechas”, killed in combat.

- Capture of two drug traffickers: alias "Mesi" and alias "Memo fantasma."

- From August 7, 2018, to March 31, 2022, in terms of affecting the structures of the ELN, 979 members of this OAG have demobilized.

Additionally, Peace with Legality was created through Decree 965 of 2020 and carried out, through which members of Organized Armed Groups (OAG) could turn themselves in. Between November 2020 and March 2022, 500 members of OAGs have been brought to justice, of which 342 belonged to Residual Organized Armed Groups, 145 members of Clan del Golfo, 7 belonging to Los Caparros and 6 members of Los Pelusos.

Main achievements in the fight against drug trafficking

Eradication of illicit crops 
In 2021, 103,290 hectares of illicit crops were eradicated.
Between January 1 and March 31, 2022, 18,176 hectares of illicit crops were eradicated

Under the government of President Iván Duque, between August 7, 2018, and March 31, 2022, 376,746 hectares of illicit crops were eradicated, concentrating the greatest effort during this period in the Departments of Putumayo, Nariño, Antioquia, Bolívar, Guaviare, Caquetá and Norte de Santander, identified through surveillance reports of territories affected by illicit crops by the Office of the United Nations on Drugs and Crime (UNODC) as productive enclaves. It is worth noting that, by court order, eradication operations by the Armed Forces were suspended in the Department of Nariño in May 2021.

Fight against the world drug problem 

In terms of interdiction, under the government of President Iván Duque, between August 7, 2018, and March 31, 2022, 1,938 tons of cocaine hydrochloride were seized for an estimated value of US$63.943 million on the United States market, resulting in the elimination of more than 4.844 million doses of the drug off the market.

Between January 2021 and March 31, 2022, 104.8 tons of cocaine base have been seized.

Between January 2021 and March 31, 2022, more than 889.3 tons of coca leaf have been seized.

Between January 2021 and March 31, 2022, more than 610.6 tons of marijuana have been seized.

Between January 2021 and March 31, 2022, 7,180 buildings used to manufacture illicit drugs have been destroyed.

Social Achievements 

As director of DAPRE (2019), he led the national debate that resulted in:

- Strengthening access to better education and employment opportunities for youth.
- Effectively fighting and prosecuting corruption.
- Increasing social investment in areas most affected by violence.

He led the COVID-19 Crisis Committee where he monitored the established measures on the emergency decrees and assisted in inter-institutional coordination to guarantee that the aid and programs to face the pandemic reached the citizens and businesses who needed it the most. He led the initiative "Opportunities for All", framed in the "Commitment for Colombia" economic reactivation plan, through which more than 200,000 employment, education and business opportunities were provided for all Colombians.

As Councilman of Bogota, he achieved the following:

- The Agreement for Bogota to have a larger electric bus fleet.
- The creation of Orange Districts
- Creation of the Security Secretariat.

As director of the Bavaria Foundation (2012-2015), he achieved:

- The training of more than 19,000 shopkeepers as entrepreneurs and community leaders.
- Direction and coordination in the execution of social programs and relations with the community.
- Management of value chain improvement programs for shopkeepers and suppliers.

As director of the ICBF (2011-2013) he managed the following:

- The execution of the Cero a Siempre strategy, achieving comprehensive care for one million boys and girls in early childhood.
- He participated in the creation of the Generations with well-being program to serve children and adolescents.
- He was responsible for directing, executing, and monitoring programs to prevent adolescent pregnancy, child labor, and the use of alcohol and drugs for 200,000 adolescents – Generations with Wellbeing.

As Presidential Advisor and General Director of the Presidential Agency for Social Action and International Cooperation between 2009 and 2011, he was involved in the following achievements:

- Extending coverage to 300,000 families in action.
- The design and execution of the UNIDOS program to overcome extreme poverty for 1.5 million families.
- The creation of income-generation programs for vulnerable populations such as a saving plan for women, employment incentives, and mini-supply chains. 
- Follow-up to the strategic planning of the Investment Fund for Peace.
- The quality management system was created within the area of social programs.

As deputy director of the MIDAS Program and USAID (2008-2009), he designed and executed the Productive Ethnic Territories program for Afro-Colombians and coordinated linking vulnerable populations, displaced persons, mothers who are heads of households, and indigenous and Afro-Colombians to the alternative development programs.

Additionally, alternative development projects were carried out where farmers planted and substituted illicit crops for 40,000 hectares of palm, 30,000 hectares of cocoa, and 6,000 hectares of specialty coffee crops.

Additionally, between 1992 and 2003, different achievements were achieved, such as:

- Becoming a coordinating member of the National Youth Policy Consultation at the FES Leadership Institute.
- Designing the direction and coordination of the training program for 600 youth.
- Being International Vice President of students in economic and commercial sciences at AIESEC in Brussels, Belgium, where he coordinated the global program of entrepreneurship and corporate responsibility.

Additionally, between 1992 and 2003 he:

- Was coordinating member of the National Youth Policy Consultation at the FES Leadership Institute.
- Designed the direction and coordination of the training program for 600 youth.
- Being International Vice President of students in economic and commercial sciences at AIESEC in Brussels Belgium, he coordinated the global program of entrepreneurship and corporate responsibility.

Sustainability Achievements 

As Councilman of Bogota between 2016 and 2019, urban sustainability projects were promoted and aimed at improving the city's quality of life. He was also the author and co-author of important agreements for the city such as:

- Bogota Clean Up Day.
- Creation of the Bogota Metro Company.
- Creation of the Bogota Security Secretariat.
- Agreement that traces the roadmap for Electric Buses in Bogota: to have the largest fleet of electric buses in Latin America.
- Agreement to avoid lines in Transmilenio.
- He was also a speaker for the District Development Plan “Bogota Better for All 2016 – 2020”.

As director of the Bavaria Foundation (2012-2015), he participated in carrying out sustainable development program in terms of water, recycling, and environmental awareness.

As director of the ICBF (2011-2013), he promoted the implementation of the Quality Management System as a strategy for sustainability and organizational management.

As deputy director of the USAID MIDAS Program (2008-2009), the following results were achieved in terms of sustainability: the execution of alternative development projects in agriculture, forestry, and support for small and medium-sized enterprises for the benefit of vulnerable populations.   
                                                                                                                                                                                                                                  
Additionally, between the years 1992–2003, he achieved the following:

- He was coordinator of the All-Saints Church of Bogota and member of the Education Alliance, part of the Chamber of Commerce.
- As an associate researcher at the INITIATIVE FOR A COMPETTITITIVE INNER CITY in Boston USA, he consulted for a competitiveness study for the city of Saint Luis, Missouri.

References 

1970 births
Living people
Politicians from Bogotá
Democratic Center (Colombia) politicians
Government ministers of Colombia
Colombian Ministers of Defense
Del Rosario University alumni
Columbia University alumni